The Hungarian basketball league system, or Hungarian basketball league pyramid is a series of interconnected competitions for professional basketball clubs in the country of Hungary. The system has a hierarchical format with a promotion and demotion system between competitions at different levels.

Men

The tier levels

For the 2015–16 season, the Hungarian basketball league system is as follows:

Cup competitions

Magyar Kupa (men's basketball) (Magyar Kupa, férfi)

Magyar Kupa (women's basketball) (Magyar Kupa, női)

See also
League system
European professional club basketball system
Spanish basketball league system
Greek basketball league system
Italian basketball league system
French basketball league system
Russian basketball league system
Turkish basketball league system
German basketball league system
Serbian basketball league system
Polish basketball league system
South American professional club basketball system

External links
Hungarian Basketball Federation 

Basketball league systems